Los Serranos is a neighborhood within the city of Chino Hills in southwestern San Bernardino County, California. It is named after the Los Serranos Golf Course within the east-central portion of the Chino Hills city limits, near the Chino Valley Freeway (SR 71). The U.S. Census reported Los Serranos as a separate place in the 1990 Census until the low income region was incorporated by the city of Chino Hills on December 1, 1991.  Los Serranos Golf Course failed in the stock crash of the late 20s leaving a subdivision divided into narrow golf course bungalows behind. The average lot width is 30 feet. The ZIP code serving the neighborhood is 91709.

Name
Los Serranos loosely means "the hill-dwellers" in Spanish.  Various translations include "highlanders," "mountaineers," or "men of the hills." The area is also the homeland of the Serrano tribe of Native Americans, given that name by Spanish missionaries.

The Greening family owned the golf course and put in the sewer system as part of the original water works well before most of the properties were developed. Greening also owned Dam Number 808 which routinely flooded areas below it until former State Senator Ruben Ayala put in a flood control channel at the personal expense of landowners affected by Greening's flooding. Apparently Greening was not required to contribute, even though the flood control channel was a requirement for the dam licensing of 1936 or so. Christine Arias is the mayor of the Los Serranos sub division.

Area
Los Serranos is a substandard lot size subdivision within the city of Chino Hills.  It is further divided by locals into two sections known locally as "Upper" and "Lower" Los Serranos. The line of demarcation between the two areas is Ramona Avenue. The eastern part is "Lower" Los Serranos because it was subjected to flooding until very recently, whereas Western areas of Los Serranos are known as "Upper" Los Serranos due to general lack of flooding.  Houses along the rim of the Los Serrannos Golf Course have narrow lots and are not well maintained, and suffer from errant golf balls.  Lower Los Serranos is defined by Joyce and George Butler who run Support Our Area Residents (S.O.A.R.), a non registered public charity from their home. They have been awarded the status of Community Heroes of 2007 by the Pomona Fairground and City of Chino Hills and the local newspaper, Chino Champion publications.
 
A third community within Los Serranos is the Greening-run 'retirement' mobile home park area which surrounds Lake Los Serranos, dam number 808.

History
Los Serranos, like the rest of Chino Hills, is primarily a residential community. Its original housing supported the staff and guests at The Los Serranos Golf and Country Club prior to the 1950s. Very few businesses have persisted in the area. There is the decades-old Descanso Market on Descanso Street which is the sole surviving business in Upper Los Serranos, which is the area's only Post Office center. One block away there was a fast food hamburger joint that closed down in the 60s/70s and is now the site of two houses. Next to the market is the local voting location. There are two churches in Upper Los Serranos; one focusing on local Asian population and one, the former American Legion post, predominantly appeals to the local Hispanics living in the area.  In Lower Los Serranos there is one church. Lower Los Serranos also has one liquor store referred to as The Country Store; this store has also served the local residents for decades. It once had an exit from the Chino Valley (71) Freeway, making it easy for snacks and gasoline pit stops from a Chevron that once existed across the store. This Country Store also provided bait for the local fishermen of Prado Park Lake. The Los Serranos Golf and Country Club is the predominant business in Lower Los Serranos which still provides some jobs to local residents.

Transportation
 Soquel Canyon Pkwy.
 Chino Valley Fwy. (SR 71)
 Chino Hills Pkwy.
 Los Serranos Blvd
 Yorba Ave/Los Serranos Country Club Drive/Butterfield Ranch Rd (a single highway, although under three different names)

Education
There are 2 schools located within Los Serranos—the Alternative Education Center and Chaparral Elementary School. The Alternative Education Center occupies the site of the former Los Serranos Elementary School, which closed following the 2008-2009 academic year. Located on the west end of Los Serranos at 15650 Pipeline Avenue, this site is "technically" located in the Chino Hills community of Glenmeade but as it faces the Los Serranos area and typically serves students from Los Serranos, it has locally been considered part of Los Serranos. The Alternative Education Center reopened in fall 2010 with a variety of programs, including a virtual high-school with online programs, independent studies, Chino Valley Learning Academy, Workforce Initiative Program and a variety of other programs. A more recent school is Chaparral Elementary, located on the east end of Los Serranos, opened in August 2006. 
Both schools in Los Serranos are part of the Chino Valley Unified School District.

References 

Former census-designated places in California
Neighborhoods in Chino Hills, California